The Roll-O-Plane also known as the Bullet is an amusement park ride that originated in America. It was invented by the Eyerly Aircraft Company of Salem, Oregon, as an updated and more exciting version of the Loop-O-Plane. The ride is commonly nicknamed the "Salt and Pepper Shakers".

The ride consists of a rotating arm mounted to a pivoting hinge on a central support column. The arm has two enclosed cars (one at the top and bottom). Each car holds four riders seated in pairs facing opposite directions making the maximum capacity eight riders.

When in motion, the arm swings until it makes a complete loop, though the riders never become inverted. This is because the ride has two "twists" that the older version did not. First, the arm pivots while the ride is in motion. Second, the cars are free to rotate horizontally or "roll" while the ride is in motion, always keeping the riders right-side-up.

This once common ride can now only be found in a handful of parks including:
Arnolds Park Amusement Park in Arnolds Park, Iowa as the Roll-O-Plane
Knoebels Amusement Resort in Elysburg, Pennsylvania as the Satellite
Joyland Amusement Park in Lubbock, Texas as the Roll-O-Plane
Lakeside Amusement Park in Lakeside, Colorado as the Roll-O-Plane
Little Amerricka in Marshall, Wisconsin as Test Pilot
Sylvan Beach Amusement Park in Sylvan Beach, New York as the Bomber

See also
Rock-O-Plane
Loop-O-Plane

References

External links
 The Flat Joint Roll-O-Plane page with photos

Amusement rides